A cornmill grinds cereal grain into flour and middlings.

Cornmill may refer to:

 Cornmill Shopping Centre, a shopping center in Darlington, England
 Cornmill Stream and Old River Lea, a biological site in Waltham Abbey, Essex
 Cornmill Stream, a minor tributary of the River Lea

See also
 Mill (disambiguation)